Conus gallopalvoi is a species of sea snail, a marine gastropod mollusk in the family Conidae, the cone snails, cone shells or cones.

These snails are predatory and venomous. They are capable of "stinging" humans.

Description

Distribution
This marine species of cone snail is endemic to the Cape Verdes.

References

 Cossignani T. & Fiadeiro R. (2017). Otto nuovi coni da Capo Verde. Malacologia Mostra Mondiale. 94: 26-36.page(s): 27

gallopalvoi
Gastropods of Cape Verde
Gastropods described in 2017